Denis Mickiewicz, born into a Russian family in Latvia, is a founding conductor of the Yale Russian Chorus and professor emeritus at Duke University. He emigrated first to Austria and then to the United States in 1952. He was presented with a Festschrift in his honor in 2009.

References

Living people
Yale University alumni
Duke University faculty
Year of birth missing (living people)